Siti Fadia Silva Ramadhanti (born 16 November 2000) is an Indonesian badminton player affiliated with Djarum club.

Career 
Born in Kampung Bantar Jati, Klapanunggal, Jonggol, Bogor Regency, Ramadhanti joined the Djarum badminton club in 2014, and in 2017 she was selected to join the Indonesian Junior team. In 2016, she won the Jakarta Open Junior International tournament in the U-17 girls' doubles event partnered with Agatha Imanuela. Ramadhanti made her debut at the BWF Superseries tournament with Imanuela in Indonesia Open but lost in the first round to the Danish pair. In October 2016, she competed at the Badminton Asia U-17 Junior Championships and won the girls' doubles gold with Imanuela and mixed doubles bronze with Rehan Naufal Kusharjanto. In 2017, she reach the girls' doubles semi-finals at the German Junior, Thailand Junior, mixed doubles semi-finals at the India Junior Grand Prix, girls' doubles final at the Jaya Raya Junior Grand Prix, India Junior Grand Prix, and also mixed doubles final at the Malaysia Junior tournaments.

In August 2017, Ramadhanti won the mixed doubles gold, mixed team silver, and girls' doubles bronze at the Asian Junior Championships. Ramadhanti was selected to join the Indonesia national junior team to compete at the 2017 World Junior Championships. At that tournament, she and Kusharjanto reached the mixed doubles final but lost to their compatriot Rinov Rivaldy and Pitha Haningtyas Mentari in the rubber game. In the senior event, she and Imanuela were the semi-finalists at the Indonesia International Series tournament. She won her first senior international tournament at the Indonesia International Challenge in the mixed doubles event partnered with Kusharjanto.

Ramadhanti opened the 2018 season as a quarter-finalists in the Thailand Masters with Imanuela. In July, she won bronze medals in the mixed team and girls' doubles at the Asian Junior Championships in Jakarta. At the Markham World Junior Championships she won a silver in the mixed doubles and two bronze medals in the team and girls' doubles.

In the first half of the 2019 season, the Ramadhanti and Imanuela partnership did not show satisfactory results, with their best result being a semifinal in the Orléans Masters. She was then paired with Ribka Sugiarto, and made their debut as quarter-finalists at the Russian Open in July. Not long after they were paired, Ramadhanti and Sugiarto won their first World Tour title at the Indonesia Masters Super 100. Some of their achievements were also being semi-finalists in the Chinese Taipei Open, where they beat second seed Lee So-hee and Shin Seung-chan; and also being a quarter-finalists in the Macau Open. She took part in the Philippines Southeast Asian Games, and won the silver medal for Indonesia in the women's team event. In the individual women's doubles, Ramadhanti and Sugiarto were stopped in the quarter-finals to second seed Chow Mei Kuan and Lee Meng Yean.

In May 2022, Ramadhanti began her partnership with the Tokyo Olympics gold medalist, Apriyani Rahayu. In their debut, the duo managed to win the women's doubles title at the Vietnam Southeast Asian Games. This new pair immediately showed satisfying results, by winning the Malaysia and Singapore Opens, and became finalists in the Indonesia Masters.

2023 
In January, Ramadhanti and Rahayu had to retire in the semi-finals of Malaysia Open against first-seeded Chinese pair Chen Qingchen and Jia Yifan as Ramadhanti was injured. Partnered with Rahayu, Ramadhanti reached the highest rank in her career as world number 5 in the BWF World rankings after Malaysia Open. They competed in the home tournament, Indonesia Masters, but unfortunately lost in the quarter-finals from 4th seed Thai pair Jongkolphan Kititharakul and Rawinda Prajongjai.

In February, Ramadhanti join the Indonesia national badminton team to compete at the Badminton Asia Mixed Team Championships, but unfortunately the teams lost in the quarter-finals from team Korea.

Achievements

Southeast Asian Games 
Women's doubles

BWF World Junior Championships 
Girls' doubles

Mixed doubles

Asian Junior Championships 
Girls' doubles

Mixed doubles

BWF World Tour (3 titles, 1 runner-up) 
The BWF World Tour, which was announced on 19 March 2017 and implemented in 2018, is a series of elite badminton tournaments sanctioned by the Badminton World Federation (BWF). The BWF World Tour is divided into levels of World Tour Finals, Super 1000, Super 750, Super 500, Super 300 (part of the HSBC World Tour), and the BWF Tour Super 100.

Women's doubles

BWF International Challenge/Series (1 title, 1 runner-up) 
Women's doubles

Mixed doubles

  BWF International Challenge tournament
  BWF International Series tournament

BWF Junior International (4 runners-up) 
Women's doubles

Mixed doubles

  BWF Junior International Grand Prix tournament
  BWF Junior International Challenge tournament
  BWF Junior International Series tournament
  BWF Junior Future Series tournament

Performance timeline

National team 
 Junior level

 Senior level

Individual competitions

Junior level 
Girls' doubles

Mixed doubles

Senior level

Women's doubles

Mixed doubles

References

External links 
 

2000 births
Living people
People from Bogor Regency
Sportspeople from West Java
Indonesian female badminton players
Competitors at the 2019 Southeast Asian Games
Southeast Asian Games silver medalists for Indonesia
Southeast Asian Games medalists in badminton
Competitors at the 2021 Southeast Asian Games
Southeast Asian Games gold medalists for Indonesia
21st-century Indonesian women